James Brown (16 February 1924 – 17 January 2002) was a Scottish footballer who played as a centre forward for clubs in Scotland and England.

Brown was born in Cumnock. He was a prolific goal-scorer in a brief career following the Second World War, notably scoring 16 goals in just 18 games for Motherwell and being Bradford City's club top scorer in his one season at the club, in 1948–49, when he amassed 11 goals in 20 games. He also played for Chesterfield and the Queen of the South side of Billy Houliston, Roy Henderson, Jim Patterson and Dougie Sharpe. Brown then played for Carlisle United, before dropping down to the Carlisle and District League with Annan Athletic.

References

1924 births
2002 deaths
Scottish footballers
Scottish Football League players
English Football League players
Motherwell F.C. players
Chesterfield F.C. players
Bradford City A.F.C. players
Queen of the South F.C. players
Carlisle United F.C. players
Annan Athletic F.C. players
Watford F.C. wartime guest players
People from Cumnock
Kello Rovers F.C. players
Association football forwards
Footballers from East Ayrshire